Chittenden Corporation was a banking company founded in Burlington, Vermont. The stock was traded on the New York Stock Exchange from 1974 to 2007. The company merged on January 1, 2008, with People's United Bank in Bridgeport, Connecticut.

Chittenden Corporation was a bank holding company that provided financial services through its banking subsidiaries. The company was the holding company parent and owned 100% of the common stock of Chittenden Trust Company (doing business as Chittenden Bank), Flagship Bank and Trust Company, The Bank of Western Massachusetts, Maine Bank & Trust, and Ocean National Bank. Through its subsidiaries, Chittenden offered a variety of lending services, with loans totaling approximately $4.7 billion during the year ended December 31, 2006. Chittenden's largest loan categories were commercial loans and residential real estate loans. Commercial loans included commercial, municipal, multi-family residential real estate, commercial real estate and construction. Chittenden owned banks in Vermont, New Hampshire, Maine, and Massachusetts.

People's United Bank
As of July 2010, all seven banks were integrated under the People's United Bank brand, and no longer are referred to as divisions of the organization.

References

External links
Chittenden Bank Website, Internet Archives 1996-2011

Defunct banks of the United States
Defunct companies based in Vermont
Banks established in 1947
1947 establishments in Vermont
Banks disestablished in 2008
2008 disestablishments in Vermont
2008 mergers and acquisitions